Sokolov is a rural locality (a khutor) in Verkhnegnutovskoye Rural Settlement, Chernyshkovsky District, Volgograd Oblast, Russia. The population was 78 as of 2020.

Geography 
Sokolov is located on the left bank of the Tsimla River, 21 km southeast of Chernyshkovsky (the district's administrative centre) by road. Verkhnegnutov is the nearest rural locality.

References 

Rural localities in Chernyshkovsky District